The 1993–94 Belgian Hockey League season was the 74th season of the Belgian Hockey League, the top level of ice hockey in Belgium. Six teams participated in the league, and Herentals IJC won the championship.

Regular season

Playoffs

Semifinals
Herentals IJC - Heist-op-den-Berg 4-8, 9-5 (1-0 OT)
Griffoens Geel - Buffalos Liege 7-6, 2-6 (2-0 SO)

Final
Herentals IJC - Griffoens Geel 7-6, 6-8 (1-0 OT)

3rd place
Heist-op-den-Berg - Buffalos Liege 14-4, 9-6

References
Season on hockeyarchives.info

Belgian Hockey League
Belgian Hockey League seasons
Bel